Walter Thomas John McKechnie (born June 19, 1947) is a Canadian former professional hockey centre. He played for nine teams in the National Hockey League (NHL) and four minor professional teams over a 17-year pro career.

Playing career
McKechnie was drafted sixth overall by the Toronto Maple Leafs in the 1963 NHL Amateur Draft of 16-year-old players. He played junior hockey with the London Nationals from 1965 to 1967 before turning professional with the Phoenix Roadrunners of the Western Hockey League (WHL) in the 1967–68 season, where he was named the league's rookie of the year. In February 1968, he was acquired by the expansion Minnesota North Stars and played four games in the NHL regular season followed by nine playoff games. For the next three years, he split his time between the North Stars and their minor league affiliates.

In May 1971, McKechnie was traded to the California Golden Seals and received a lot of ice time over his three years with the team, scoring 23 goals and 52 points in the 1973–74 season. In June 1974, he was involved in a three-way trade using the intra-league draft where he was claimed by the New York Rangers and immediately sent to the Boston Bruins for Derek Sanderson. He struggled with the Bruins and was dealt mid-season to the Detroit Red Wings. The next year in Detroit, he put up what would be his NHL career-high numbers, with 26 goals and 82 points, leading the team in scoring. McKechnie followed that a 25-goal season in 1976–77. After the season, he played for Team Canada in the 1977 World Ice Hockey Championships.

Before the next season, McKechnie was traded to the Washington Capitals. He got off to a poor start in Washington and was traded to the Cleveland Barons in December 1977. McKechnie became the property of the Minnesota North Stars when the Barons and North Stars franchises were merged following the 1977–78 season. He was traded to the Toronto Maple Leafs prior to the 1978–79 season, where he scored 25 goals. His goal production dropped the next year, and McKechnie was traded to the Colorado Rockies, where he continued to struggle. He was signed as a free agent by the Red Wings in 1981 and rebounded with an 18-goal season, followed by 14 goals in 1982–83. McKechnie spent the 1983–84 season in the Central Hockey League (CHL) with the Salt Lake Golden Eagles and then retired at age 37. In 955 career NHL games, he scored 214 goals and 392 assists for 606 points.

Personal
McKechnie was a regular at The Strand Billiards in London while playing for the Ontario Hockey Association's London Nationals during the mid-1960s. The pool hall, owned by the late Len Bonk since it first opened in 1952 and closed in September 2005, was like a second home to McKechnie, who refers to The Strand as "the academy."

From 1986 to 2009 he owned and operated "McKeck's", a family-style restaurant on Highland Street in Haliburton, Ontario. He has retired from that business, but the restaurant still operates under the same name. In 2009, McKechnie was inducted into the London Sports Hall of Fame.

Most recently his efforts are directed at fundraising for Prostate Cancer Canada.

McKechnie was elected to Dysart et al municipal council in 2010, and was acclaimed as the municipality's deputy mayor in the 2022 municipal elections.

Career statistics

Regular season and playoffs

International

References

External links

 The Strand Billiards and Walt McKechnie

1947 births
Living people
Boston Bruins players
California Golden Seals players
Canadian ice hockey centres
Canadian sportsperson-politicians
Cleveland Barons (NHL) players
Colorado Rockies (NHL) players
Detroit Red Wings players
Ice hockey people from Ontario
Iowa Stars (CHL) players
London Nationals players
Minnesota North Stars players
National Hockey League first-round draft picks
Ontario municipal councillors
People from Haliburton County
Phoenix Roadrunners (WHL) players
Salt Lake Golden Eagles (CHL) players
Sportspeople from London, Ontario
Toronto Maple Leafs draft picks
Toronto Maple Leafs players
Washington Capitals players